Tarik Frimpong is an Ethiopian/ Ghanaian -Australian actor, singer and dancer from Melbourne. He made his feature film debut playing the role of Angus in Disney's 2018 film Mary Poppins Returns.

Career 
Tarik played the role of Young Simba in the Australian Production of The Lion King Musical. He also appeared in Bring It On: The Musical, playing the role of Twig in the Australian premiere. Tarik has appeared as Principal Standby in MADIBA: the Musical and he has appeared on the West End playing the role of Prince Abdullah in Disney's Aladdin the Musical.

Tarik has danced for numerous recording artists including; Justin Bieber, FKA Twigs, Aston Merrygold, Missy Higgins, & Zhu.

References

Male actors from Melbourne
Living people
Australian dancers
Year of birth missing (living people)
Australian male film actors
21st-century Australian male actors
21st-century Ghanaian male actors
Ghanaian male film actors
Ghanaian male stage actors
Australian male musical theatre actors
Singers from Melbourne
21st-century Australian singers
21st-century Ghanaian singers
21st-century Australian dancers
Ghanaian dancers
21st-century Australian male singers